Steambot Chronicles, known in Japan as  is a 2005 action role-playing game developed and published by Irem Software Engineering in Japan for the PlayStation 2. It was later published by Atlus in North America and 505 Games in PAL regions. The game features a sandbox style of steam-powered, mech-based gameplay.

A sequel, Bumpy Trot 2, was announced and shown at the 2006 Tokyo Game Show, though it was officially cancelled in 2011. Two spin-off titles were also released: Steambot Chronicles: Battle Tournament for the PlayStation Portable and Blocks Club with Bumpy Trot, originally released for the PlayStation 2 and later ported to the PlayStation Portable.

Plot
Steambot Chronicles begins with a personality quiz, answers to these questions affecting the personality of the character and how others will react towards him. Afterwards, a young male named Vanilla awakes on the shore of Seagull Beach, a seemingly cheerful girl named Coriander (shortened Connie) beside him, and currently suffers from amnesia due to a shipwreck nearby that occurred before the events of the game. The player learns that Connie is picking herbs to use as medicine for her bed-ridden mother, Rosemary, who lives in Nefroburg. Vanilla spots a vehicle on a nearby cliff that shoots a bazooka, trapping the two in Seagull Beach.

Connie must get home to Nefroburg on the last bus, but cannot because of the fallen boulder blocking her path. They go to a nearby cottage that, the player finds out, holds bad memories for Connie, evidence of this being her in a picture with two unknown figures. The two stumble upon an old run-down Trotmobile resembling a bipedal automobile, which they use to leave Seagull Beach. Connie discovers that the bus already left minutes ago, and requests that Vanilla take her to Nefroburg.

On the trip, the two encounter a hoodlum from a gang known as the "Killer Elephants", who challenges Vanilla to a duel. After defeating him, the two encounter Marjoram, one of the members of the Garland Globetrotters (a band in which Connie is the lead singer). Vanilla will have to find Basil, another member of the band, and take him back to Marjoram and Connie.

The four later head back to Nefroburg. On the way, they encounter a humongous quadruped mechanical fortress (operated by the "Killer Elephants"), and Vanilla must destroy it before they officially head to Nefroburg, where they encounter yet another member, Fennel (who is suspected of firing the bazooka as Connie and Vanilla on the beach). After attending a concert at night, the player may choose to change the plot and Vanilla himself.

Characters
 Vanilla R. Beans (Voiced by Spike Spencer in English) is the protagonist of the game. He awakes on a plank of wood in Seagull Beach, a shipwreck found nearby, and suffers from amnesia after the accident. After attending a concert in Nefroburg, the player may choose to make Vanilla a hero or villain, depending on the decisions chosen.
Coriander is the lead vocalist of the Garland Globetrotters. She and Vanilla first meet on Seagull Beach while she was collecting herbs for her sick bed-ridden mother. She seems like a typical cheerful girl, but this belies a sadness from a past tragedy.
Marjoram  is drummer and saxophonist for the Globetrotters. Marjoram is a dedicated hard-working man, also taking care of the band's paperwork and finances. His family owns a grocery store in Happy Garland.
Savory is the backup vocalist and pianist for the Globetrotters. Savory is like a big sister to Coriander and is extremely popular with the band's male fans. She is revealed to be the leader of Blood Mantis along with Dandelion.
Basil is the bass string for the Globetrotters. He is short and immature, but has a knack for cheering people up.
Fennel is an original member of Golbetrotters who played guitar before leaving the band to pursue his musical dreams. Even after he leaves the band, he remains concerned about the other Globetrotters.
Dandelion: (Voiced by Yuri Lowenthal in English) The former leader of the Globetrotters, for which he played the violin. He is now a Master Craftsman that crafts instruments in a small shop in the woods. He lost his brother Chickory in an accident a few years back, but he seems to have moved on.
Ciboulette  is the captain of the Juniper Berry, a ship. She instructs the player in how to pilot a Trotmobile in the game's tutorial.
Rosemary is Coriander's bed-ridden mother, a sweet and gentlewoman. She asks the player to be a good friend to Coriander as she is aware of her daughter's inner turmoil. Was the former leader of the Globetrotters a long time ago, and even taught Dandelion how to play.
Mallow is a man who Vanilla gets confused with constantly during the story. Has some kind of connection to Coriander and the others, a very dark one. He is the son of a wealthy man that owns the hospital in Happy Garland. When he was young, he used to tease Dandelion and Chicory because they were poor. The player controls him during the tutorial mode which acts as a semi-prelude to the actual game.

Gameplay

Trotmobiles
The mechs, or "Trotmobiles" as they are called in the game (Trot Vehicles in the original), encompass most of the gameplay. They are introduced before the player gets to the first town, and function for transportation, trading minigames, and battles. They can be modified with dozens of parts, which can be purchased, found, or crafted. They range from small and speedy but frail, to large, powerful, and sturdy, but slow. Categories by ( Heavy and Strong but Slow ) or ( Light and Frail but Fast ) but there are trotmobiles which is perfect in all term ( Light and Strong and Fast ) for example Schneider's and Elder's trotmobiles at which they are both the top 1st and 2nd Gladiator in the game ranked S, it's left for player to discover and customize their own trotmobiles.

Music
Music plays a major role in Steambot Chronicles's plot. Vanilla is at first a solo musician on the street, until he is invited to join the Garland Globetrotters. With each successful concert, Vanilla earns tips and posters of the other Globetrotters, as well as sheet music for new songs. The sheet music allows Vanilla to practice songs solo. If he plays well enough, he will be asked to manage the band.

There are several instruments in the game, each with different control schemes. Vanilla starts out with a harmonica, and can later acquire the trumpet, saxophone, violin, string bass, accordion, drums, and guitar as well as play church organs and pianos found in bars or colleges. The main reward for playing music is tips.

There are six vocal songs, four that Coriander performs during the main story, and two which can be unlocked through sidequests. Nadia Gifford wrote and performed five of the songs for Coriander:

1. In Your Voice
2. Impossible
3. I Cry
4. Just Shout It Out
5. See You Later

The last song in the game is sung by Ryan Kerwin as Fennel:
6. Music Revolution

In an optional side-quest, Vanilla can acquire an electric guitar and join Fennel's "Fennel and the Blue Lightning" band.

Reception

The game received "average" reviews according to video game review aggregator Metacritic. In Japan, Famitsu gave it a score of one nine, one eight, one seven, and one eight, for a total of 32 out of 40.

Hyper commended the game for its "huge amount of freedom [and] clever musical rhythm games" but criticised it for its "slowdown [and] load times".

Cancelled sequel
The game was in development by Irem, but was cancelled along with several other games following the 2011 Tōhoku earthquake and tsunami.

Initially the game was designed for the PlayStation 2, with the first trailer showing the new protagonist and a female companion exploring a wintery forest in a Trotmobile before being confronted by larger Trotmobiles, followed by a montage of gameplay elements ranging from downhill combat, fire fighting, loading and unloading ships, and performing in a band. An issue of Famitsu revealed details that the title moved production to the PlayStation 3 and that Irem would unveil a new trailer at the 2007 Tokyo Game Show. The new trailer showed off the game's graphics (while retaining the cel-shaded style of the original), and showcasing more of the action-oriented scenes than the first trailer.

References

External links
 
  

2005 video games
Action-adventure games
Atlus games
Irem games
PlayStation 2 games
PlayStation 2-only games
Video games with cel-shaded animation
Steampunk video games
505 Games games
Open-world video games
Video games developed in Japan
Multiplayer and single-player video games